Baldwin v. Fish & Game Commission of Montana, 436 U.S. 371 (1978), was a United States Supreme Court case that affirmed the right of the state of Montana to charge higher fees for out-of-state elk hunters.

Background
In the state of Montana, the fee for an elk-hunting licenses for nonresidents of the state were substantially higher than the fee for residents of the state in the 1970s.

Decision of the Court
In a 6–3 decision in favor of the state of Montana, Justice Blackmun wrote the opinion for the majority. The court found that the licensing system bore some rational relationship to legitimate state purposes. The court concluded that the nonresidents' interest in sharing the limited resource on more equal terms with residents simply did not fall within the purview of the Privileges and Immunities Clause. Equality in access to state elk was not basic to the maintenance or well-being of the union, and whatever rights or activities were fundamental under the Privileges and Immunities Clause, elk hunting by nonresidents was not one of them. The legislative choice was an economic means not unreasonably related to the preservation of a finite resource and a substantial regulatory interest of the state because it served to limit the number of hunter days.

See also
List of United States Supreme Court cases, volume 436

References

Further reading

External links

United States Supreme Court cases
Privileges and Immunities case law
1978 in United States case law
United States Supreme Court cases of the Burger Court